Miconia nubicola is a species of plant in the family Melastomataceae. It is endemic to Jamaica.

References

nubicola
Endangered plants
Endemic flora of Jamaica
Taxonomy articles created by Polbot